Sheila O'Flanagan (born 1958 in Dublin) is a fiction writer and journalist who writes for The Irish Times.

Biography
She was born in Dublin, Ireland. Her career started in financial services at the Central Bank of Ireland and was in time promoted to chief dealer, trading things like foreign currency, bonds, and options. She wrote her first book in her thirties. She was offered a contract with an Irish publisher and gave up her job in financial trading.

She is a competitive badminton player in Ireland and has served on the Irish Sports Council Board.

In 2011, she received the Irish Popular Fiction Book of the Year Award for All for You.

Publications
Suddenly Single (1999)
Isobel's Wedding (1999)
Far from Over (2000)
My Favourite Goodbye (2001)
He's Got to Go (2002)
Caroline's Sister (2002)
Too Good to Be True (2003)
Dreaming of a Stranger (2003)
Anyone But Him (2004)
How Will I Know? (2005)
Yours, Faithfully (2006)
Bad Behaviour (2007)
Three's a Crowd (2008)
Someone Special (2008)
The Perfect Man (2009)
Stand by Me (2010)
All for You (2011)
Things We Never Say (2013)
If you were Me (2014)
My Mother′s Secret (2015)
The Crystal Run (2016)
The Missing Wife (2016)
What Happened That Night (2017)
The Hideaway (2018)
The Moment We Meet (2018)
The Season of Change (2029)
Her Husband's Mistake (2019)
The Women Who Ran Away (2020)
Three Weddings and a Proposal (2021)
What Eden did next (2022)

References

External links
 Official website

Living people
Irish fiction writers
Irish women journalists
Writers from Dublin (city)
The Irish Times people
1958 births